Dhanalakshmi is a 1977 Indian Kannada language film directed by K. S. Sathyanarayana. The film stars Srinath, Manjula and Leelavathi. The film is based on a story where a number of thieves enter a household as disguised guests and acquaintances to loot a secret treasure supposed to be hidden in there.

Cast
 Srinath
 Manjula 
 Leelavathi
 Dinesh
 Shivaram
 Baby Indira
 Shakti Prasad
 Ambareesh

Soundtrack
The music was composed by M. Ranga Rao with lyrics by Chi. Udaya Shankar and K. S. Sathyanarayana.

References

1977 films
1970s Kannada-language films
Films scored by M. Ranga Rao